Warwick Castle is a medieval castle developed from a wooden fort, originally built by William the Conqueror during 1068. Warwick is the county town of Warwickshire, England, situated on a meander of the River Avon. The original wooden motte-and-bailey castle was rebuilt in stone during the 12th century. During the Hundred Years War, the facade opposite the town was refortified, resulting in one of the most recognisable examples of 14th-century military architecture. It was used as a stronghold until the early 17th century, when it was granted to Sir Fulke Greville by James I in 1604. Greville converted it to a country house, and it was owned by the Greville family (who became Earls of Warwick in 1759) until 1978, when it was bought by the Tussauds Group.

In 2007, the Tussauds Group was purchased by the Blackstone Group, which merged it with Merlin Entertainments. Warwick Castle was then sold to Nick Leslau's investment firm, Prestbury Group, under a sale and leaseback agreement. Merlin continues to operate the site under a renewable 35-year lease.

Location

Warwick Castle is situated in the town of Warwick, on a sandstone bluff at a bend of the River Avon. The river, which runs below the castle on the east side, has eroded the rock the castle stands on, forming a cliff. The river and cliff form natural defences. When construction began in 1068, four houses belonging to the Abbot of Coventry were demolished to provide space. The castle's position made it strategically important in safeguarding the Midlands against rebellion. During the 12th century, King Henry I was suspicious of Roger de Beaumont, 2nd Earl of Warwick. To counter the earl's influence, Henry bestowed Geoffrey de Clinton with a position of power rivalling that of the earl.

History

Antecedent
An Anglo-Saxon burh was established on the site in 914; with fortifications instigated by Æthelflæd, daughter of Alfred the Great. The burh she established was one of ten which defended Mercia against the invading Danes. Its position allowed it to dominate the Fosse Way, as well as the river valley and the crossing over the River Avon. Though the motte to the south-west of the present castle is now called "Ethelfleda's Mound" ('Ethelfleda' being an alternative form of Æthelflæd), it is in fact part of the later Norman fortifications, and not of Anglo-Saxon origin.

It was also at this time that what is now Warwick School was founded in the castle - making it arguably the oldest boys' school in the country. It still resides just over the River Avon, visible from all of the castle's towers.

Middle Ages

After the Norman conquest of England, William the Conqueror established a motte-and-bailey castle at Warwick in 1068 to maintain control of the Midlands as he advanced northwards. Building a castle in a pre-existing settlement could require demolishing properties on the intended site. In the case of Warwick, the least recorded of the 11 urban castles in the 1086 survey, four houses were torn down to make way for the castle. A motte-and-bailey castle consists of a mound – on which usually stands a keep or tower – and a bailey, which is an enclosed courtyard. William II appointed Henry de Beaumont, the son of a powerful Norman family, as constable of the castle. In 1088, Henry de Beaumont was made the first Earl of Warwick. He founded the Church of All Saints within the castle walls by 1119; the Bishop of Worcester, believing that a castle was an inappropriate location for a church, removed it in 1127–28.

In 1153, the wife of Roger de Beaumont, 2nd Earl of Warwick, was tricked into believing that her husband was dead, and surrendered control of the castle to the invading army of Henry of Anjou, later King Henry II of England. According to the Gesta Regis Stephani, a 12th-century historical text, Roger de Beaumont died upon hearing the news that his wife had handed over the castle. King Henry II later returned the castle to the Earls of Warwick, as they had been supporters of his mother, Empress Matilda, in The Anarchy of 1135–1154.

During the reign of King Henry II (1154–89), the motte-and-bailey was replaced with a stone keep castle. This new phase took the form of a shell keep with all the buildings constructed against the curtain wall. During the Barons' Rebellion of 1173–74, the Earl of Warwick remained loyal to King Henry II, and the castle was used to store provisions. The castle and the lands associated with the earldom passed down to the Beaumont family until 1242. When Thomas de Beaumont, 6th Earl of Warwick, died, the castle and lands passed to his sister, Margaret de Beaumont, 7th Countess of Warwick in her own right. Her first husband, John Marshal, died soon after, and while she looked for a suitable husband, the castle was in the ownership of King Henry III of England. When she married John du Plessis in December 1242, the castle was returned to her. During the Second Barons' War of 1264–67, William Maudit, 8th Earl of Warwick, was a supporter of King Henry III. The castle was taken in a surprise attack by the forces of Simon de Montfort, 6th Earl of Leicester, from Kenilworth Castle in 1264. According to 15th-century chronicler John Rous, the walls along the northeastern side of Warwick Castle were slighted, so "that it should be no strength to the king". Maudit and his countess were taken to Kenilworth Castle and were held there until a ransom was paid. After the death of William Maudit in 1267, the title and castle passed to his nephew, William de Beauchamp, 9th Earl of Warwick. Following William's death, Warwick Castle passed through seven generations of the Beauchamp family, who, over the next 180 years, were responsible for most of the additions made to the castle. In 1312, Piers Gaveston, 1st Earl of Cornwall, was captured by Guy de Beauchamp, 10th Earl of Warwick, and imprisoned in Warwick Castle, until his execution on 9 June 1312. A group of magnates led by the Earl of Warwick and Thomas, 2nd Earl of Lancaster, accused Gaveston of stealing the royal treasure.

Under Thomas de Beauchamp, 11th Earl, the castle defences were significantly enhanced in 1330–60 on the north eastern side by the addition of a gatehouse, a barbican (a form of fortified gateway), and a tower on either side of the reconstructed wall, named Caesar's Tower and Guy's Tower. The Watergate Tower also dates from this period.

Caesar's and Guy's Towers are residential and may have been inspired by French models (for example Bricquebec). Both towers are machicolated and Caesar's Tower features a unique double parapet. The two towers are also vaulted in stone on every storey. Caesar's Tower contained a grim basement dungeon; according to local legend dating back to at least 1644 it is also known as Poitiers Tower, either because prisoners from the Battle of Poitiers in 1356 may have been imprisoned there, or because the ransoms raised from the battle helped to pay for its construction. The gatehouse features murder holes, two drawbridges, a gate, and portcullises – gates made from wood or metal. The towers of the gatehouse were machicolated.

The facade overlooking the river was designed as a symbol of the power and wealth of the Beauchamp earls and would have been "of minimal defensive value"; this followed a trend of 14th-century castles being more statements of power than designed exclusively for military use.

15th and 16th centuries

The line of the Beauchamp Earls ended in 1449 when Anne de Beauchamp, 15th Countess of Warwick, died. Richard Neville, the Kingmaker, became the next Earl of Warwick through his wife's inheritance of the title. During the summer of 1469, Neville rebelled against King Edward IV of England and imprisoned him in Warwick Castle. Neville attempted to rule in the King's name; however, constant protests by the King's supporters forced the Earl to release the King. Neville was subsequently killed in the Battle of Barnet, fighting against the King in 1471 during the Wars of the Roses. Warwick Castle then passed from Neville to his son-in-law, George Plantagenet, 1st Duke of Clarence (brother of King Edward IV). George Plantagenet was executed in 1478, and his lands passed onto his son, Edward Plantagenet, 17th Earl of Warwick; however, Edward Plantagenet was only two when his father died, so his lands were taken in the custody of The Crown. He was placed under attainder, and so could not inherit the throne, by King Henry VII of England, being held by the King for fourteen years in the Tower of London until he was executed for high treason in 1499, supposedly for conspiring to escape with the 'pretender' Perkin Warbeck. Edward was the last Earl of Warwick of the title's first creation.

In the early 1480s, King Richard III of England (the other son-in-law of Neville) instigated the construction of two gun towers, Bear and Clarence Towers, which were left unfinished on his death in 1485; with their own well and ovens, the towers were an independent stronghold from the rest of the castle, possibly in case of mutiny by the garrison. With the advent of gunpowder, the position of Keeper of the Artillery was created in 1486.

When antiquary John Leland visited the castle some time between 1535 and 1543, he noted that:

While in the care of The Crown, Warwick Castle underwent repairs and renovations using about 500 loads of stone. The castle, as well as lands associated with the earldom, was in Crown care from 1478 until 1547, when they were granted to John Dudley with the second creation of the title the Earl of Warwick. When making his appeal for ownership of the castle Dudley said of the castle's condition: "... the castle of its self is not able to lodge a good baron with his train, for all the one side of the said castle with also the dungeon tower is clearly ruinated and down to the ground".

Warwick Castle had fallen into decay due to its age and neglect, and despite his remarks Dudley did not initiate any repairs to the castle. Queen Elizabeth I visited the castle in 1566 during a tour of the country, and again in 1572 for four nights. A timber building was erected in the castle for her to stay in, and Ambrose Dudley, 3rd Earl of Warwick, left the castle to the Queen during her visits. When Ambrose Dudley died in 1590 the title of Earl of Warwick became extinct for the second time. A survey from 1590 recorded that the castle was still in a state of disrepair, noting that lead had been stolen from the roofs of some of the castle's buildings, including the chapel.

17th-century country house
In October 1601 Sir Fulke Greville wrote that "the little stone building there was, mightily in decay, the timber lodgings built thirty years ago for herself (Elizabeth I) all ruinous; ... so as in very short time there will be nothing left but a name of Warwick". 

Greville was granted the ruinous Warwick Castle by King James I in 1604 and it was converted to a country house. The conversion of the castle coincided with a period of decline in the use of castles during the 15th and 16th centuries; many were either being abandoned or converted into comfortable residences for the gentry. In the early 17th century, Robert Smythson was commissioned to draw a plan of the castle before any changes were made. Whilst the castle was undergoing repairs, it was peripherally involved in the Gunpowder Plot of 1605. The conspirators involved awaited news of their plot in Dunchurch in Warwickshire. When they discovered the plot had failed they stole cavalry horses from the stables at Warwick Castle to help in their escape. When the title of Earl of Warwick was created for the third time in 1618, the Greville family were still in possession of Warwick Castle. Fulke Greville, who was himself ennobled as Baron Brooke in 1621, spent over £20,000 (£ as of )  renovating the castle, while occupying a suite of rooms in the Watergate Tower; according to William Dugdale, a 17th-century antiquary, this made it "a place not only of great strength but extraordinary delight, with most pleasant gardens, walks and thickets, such as this part of England can hardly parallel". 

On 1 September 1628 Fulke Greville was murdered in Holborn by his manservant: Ralph Haywood – a "gentleman" – who stabbed the baron twice after discovering he had been omitted from mention in Greville's will. Greville died from his wounds four weeks later. The Watergate Tower, which is said to be haunted by his ghost, became known as the Ghost Tower. 
 
Under Robert Greville, 2nd Baron Brooke, Warwick Castle's defences were enhanced from January to May 1642 in preparation for attack during the First English Civil War. The garden walls were raised, bulwarks – barricades of beams and soil to mount artillery – were constructed and gunpowder and wheels for two cannons were obtained. Robert Greville was a Parliamentarian, and on 7 August 1642 a Royalist force laid siege to the castle. Greville was not in the castle at the time and the garrison was under the command of Sir Edward Peyto. Spencer Compton, 2nd Earl of Northampton, Lord Lieutenant of Warwickshire commanded the Royalist force. William Dugdale, acting as a herald, called for the garrison commander to surrender the castle, but he was refused. The besieging army opened fire on the castle, to little effect. According to Richard Bulstrode:

The siege was lifted on 23 August 1642 when the garrison was relieved by the forces of the Earl of Essex, and the Royalists were forced to retreat to Worcester. After the Battle of Edgehill in 1642 – the first pitched battle of the English Civil War – prisoners were held in Caesar's and Guy's Towers. During the Second English Civil War prisoners were again held at the castle, including those from the Battle of Worcester in 1651. A garrison was maintained in the castle complete with artillery and supplies from 1643 to 1660, at its strongest it numbered 302 soldiers. In 1660 the English Council of State ordered the castle governor to disband the garrison and hand over the castle to Robert Greville, 4th Baron Brooke. The state apartments were found to be outmoded and in poor repair. Under Roger and William Hurlbutt, master carpenters of Warwick, extensive modernization of the interiors was undertaken, 1669–78. To ensure that they would be in the latest taste, William was sent to Dorset to make careful notes of the interiors recently finished at Kingston Lacy for Sir Ralph Bankes to designs by Sir Roger Pratt. On 4 November 1695 the castle was in sufficient state to host a visit by King William III.

Francis Greville, 8th Baron Brooke, undertook a renewed programme of improvements to Warwick Castle and its grounds. The 8th Baron Brooke was also bestowed with the title Earl of Warwick in 1759, the fourth creation of the title. With the recreation of the title, the castle was back in the ownership of the earls of Warwick. Daniel Garrett's work at Warwick is documented in 1748; Howard Colvin attributed to him the Gothic interior of the chapel. Lancelot "Capability" Brown had been on hand since 1749. Brown, who was still head gardener at Stowe at the time and had yet to make his reputation as the main exponent of the English landscape garden, was called in by Lord Brooke to give Warwick Castle a more "natural" connection to its river. Brown simplified the long narrow stretch by sweeping it into a lawn that dropped right to the riverbank, stopped at each end by bold clumps of native trees. A serpentine drive gave an impression of greater distance between the front gates and the castle entrance.

Horace Walpole saw Brown's maturing scheme in 1751 and remarked in a letter: "The castle is enchanting. The view pleased me more than I can express; the river Avon tumbled down a cascade at the foot of it. It is well laid out by one Brown who has set up on a few ideas of Kent and Mr Southcote."

In 1754 the poet Thomas Gray, a member of Walpole's Gothicising circle, commented disdainfully on the activity at the castle:

Gray's mention of Argyle Buildings, Westminster, London, elicited a connotation of an inappropriately modern Georgian urban development, for the buildings in Argyll Street were a speculation to designs of James Gibbs, 1736–40.

Greville commissioned Italian painter Antonio Canaletto to paint Warwick Castle in 1747, while the castle grounds and gardens were undergoing landscaping by Brown. Five paintings and three drawings of the castle by Canaletto are known, making it the artist's most often represented building in Britain. Canaletto's work on Warwick Castle has been described as "unique in the history of art as a series of views of an English house by a major continental master". As well as the gardens, Greville commissioned Brown to rebuild the exterior entrance porch and stairway to the Great Hall. Brown also contributed Gothick designs for a wooden bridge over the Avon (1758). He was still at work on Warwick Castle in 1760. Timothy Lightoler was responsible for the porch being extended and extra rooms added adjacent to it in 1763–69. and during the same years William Lindley provided a new Dining Room and other interior alterations. In 1786–88 the local builder William Eboral was commissioned to build the new greenhouse conservatory, with as its principal ornament the Warwick Vase, recently purchased in Rome.

In 1802 George Greville, 2nd Earl of Warwick of the new creation, had debts amounting to £115,000 (£ as of ). The earl's estates, including Warwick Castle, were given to the Earl of Galloway and John FitzPatrick, 2nd Earl of Upper Ossory, in 1806, but the castle was returned to the earls of Warwick in 1813. The Great Hall was reroofed and repaired in Gothic taste in 1830–31 by Ambrose Poynter. Anthony Salvin was responsible for restoring the Watergate Tower in 1861–63. The castle was extensively damaged by a fire in 1871 that started to the east of the Great Hall. Although the Great Hall was gutted, the overall structure was unharmed. Restoration and reparations carried out by Salvin during 1872–75 were subsidised by donations from the public, which raised a total of £9,651 (£ as of ).

Advent of tourism

Individuals had been visiting the castle since the end of the 17th century and this grew in importance through the 19th century. In 1858 Queen Victoria visited the 4th earl with great local celebrations. However, by 1885 it would appear the visitors were becoming a nuisance as the earl closed the castle to visitors, causing consternation in the town. A local report stated, "One day last week eight American visitors who were staying at one of the principal hotels left somewhat hurriedly in consequence of their being unable to gain admission to the castle". It soon re-opened again and by 1900 had a ticket office and was employing a permanent guide. By 1936 Arthur Mee was enthusing not just that "these walls have seen something of the splendour of every generation of our [English] story", with rooms "rich in treasure beyond the dreams of avarice" but also that "their rooms are open to all who will". The collection of armoury on display at Warwick Castle is regarded as second only to that of the Tower of London.

Through the 20th century successive earls expanded its tourism potential until in 1978, after 374 years in the Greville family, it was sold to a media and entertainment company, the Tussauds Group for £1.3 million, who opened it as a tourist attraction. Tussauds performed extensive restorations to the castle and grounds. In 12 of the apartments open to tourists since the Tussauds Group takeover, a number of wax figures of historic individuals is presented. The persons depicted were guests at the 1898 weekend party hosted by Frances Countess of Warwick; the principal guest was the Prince of Wales, later Edward VII. The furniture in those rooms is said to be authentic to the period.

In 2001, Warwick Castle was named one of Britain's "Top 10 historic houses and monuments" by the British Tourist Authority; the list included Tower of London, Stonehenge, and Edinburgh Castle. Warwick Castle was recognised as Britain's best castle by the Good Britain Guide 2003. Around this time it was getting in excess of half a million visitors a year.

After the March 2007 sale of the castle's owner, The Tussauds Group, to The Blackstone Group, the site was operated by Merlin Entertainments, a division of that corporation. In July of that year, Warwick Castle was sold to the Prestbury Group
but continued to be operated by Merlin under a renewable 35-year lease.

Heritage protection

The castle is protected against unauthorised change as a scheduled monument in recognition of its status as a "nationally important" archaeological site or historic building, and is a Grade I listed building together with its boundary walls, stables, conservatory, mill and lodge.

On 23 June 2006, a £20,000 stained glass window was damaged by teenage vandals and a ceremonial sword stolen, recovered soon after.

Warwick Castle trebuchet

In June 2005, Warwick Castle became home to one of the world's largest working siege engines. It sits on the riverbank below the castle.

The machine was built with drawings from the Danish living history museum Middelaldercentret, who, in 1989, were the first to recreate a fully functioning trebuchet. It was built in Wiltshire with expertise from the Danish museum.

The trebuchet takes eight men half an hour to load and release .

On 10 April 2015 a thatched boathouse caught fire shortly after a burning cannonball was fired by the trebuchet. It was reported that a spark from the cannonball had started the blaze although a castle spokeswoman said the cause had not yet been established. Hundreds of tourists were evacuated from the castle, but the spokeswoman said they were not at any risk. The Daily Telegraph described the boathouse as "historic", "medieval" and dating to 1896, when the 5th Earl had it built to house an electric boat.

Seasonal exhibits

Other tourist attractions include "Falconer's Quest'" (a bird show, featuring bald eagles, vultures, and sea eagles), archery displays, Jousting,"The Trebuchet Show" and "The Sword in the Stone Show". The Castle is also home to "The Castle Dungeon", a live actor experience similar to that of "London Dungeons".  Warwick Castle is the subject of many ghost stories. One such instance is that of Fulke Greville who is said to haunt the Watergate Tower despite having been murdered in Holborn. The castle's reputation for being haunted is used as a tourist attraction with events such as "Warwick Ghosts Alive", a live-action show telling the story of Fulke Greville's murder. Musical events at the castle have included carolling, with performances by bands such as the Royal Spa Brass.

At times during Summer 2018, the castle offered its War of the Roses event with jousting and other action. On certain dates in August, Dragon Slayer evenings were scheduled, with dining, a projection light show, pyrotechnics, fire jousting and live action stunts.

Layout

The current castle, built in stone during the reign of King Henry II, is on the same site as the earlier Norman motte-and-bailey castle. A keep used to stand on the motte which is on the south west of the site, although most of the structure now dates from the post-medieval period. In the 17th century the motte was landscaped with the addition of a path. The bailey was incorporated into the new castle and is surrounded by stone curtain walls.

When Warwick Castle was rebuilt in the reign of King Henry II it had a new layout with the buildings against the curtain walls. The two entrances to castle are in the north and west walls. There was originally a drawbridge over the moat in the north east. In the centre of the north west wall is a gateway with Clarence and Bears towers on either side; this is a 15th-century addition to the fortifications of the castle. The residential buildings line the eastern side of the castle, facing the River Avon. These buildings include the great hall, the library, bedrooms, and the chapel.

Owners

Over its 950 years of history Warwick Castle has been owned by 36 different individuals, plus four periods as crown property under seven different monarchs. It was the family seat of three separate creations of the Earls of Warwick, and has been a family home for members of the Beaumont, Beauchamp, Neville, Plantagenet, Dudley and Greville families. The first creation of the Earldom specifically included the right of inheritance through the female line, so the castle three times had a woman (or girl) as the owner. Eleven of the owners were under 20 when they inherited, including a girl aged two and a boy aged three. At least three owners died in battle, two were executed and one murdered. Every century except the 21st has seen major building work or adaptations at the castle.

Grounds, park, accommodations

Formal gardens belonging to Warwick Castle were first recorded in 1534. Landscaping in the 17th century added spiral paths to the castle motte during Fulke Greville's programme of restoration. Francis Greville commissioned Capability Brown to re-landscape the castle grounds; he began working on the grounds and park in 1749 and had completed his work by 1757, having spent about £2,293 (£ as of ). on the project. The gardens cover . Robert Marnock created formal gardens in the castle's grounds in 1868–69.
Started in 1743 and originally known as Temple Park, Castle Park is located to the south of the castle. Its original name derived from the Knights Templar, who used to own a manor in Warwick. Houses around the perimeter of the park were demolished and the land they stood on incorporated into the park. Attempts to make profits from the park in the late 18th century included leasing it for grazing, growing wheat, and keeping sheep.

A water-powered mill in the castle grounds was probably built under Henry de Beaumont, 1st Earl of Warwick. By 1398 the mill had been relocated to just outside the eastern castle walls, on the west bank of the River Avon. Both mills were subject to flooding. By 1644, an engine house had been added to the mill. The mill was reused as an electricity generating plant after it had stopped being used to grind, but once Warwick Castle was fitted with mains electricity in 1940, the mill was no longer required and was dismantled in 1954.

The latest option at the castle is glamping, overnight stays in nicely decorated tents in an area labelled Knight's Village. The units include no cooking facilities, so the fee for the stay includes a buffet dinner and a breakfast. The previously introduced accommodations in timber lodges also remain available in the Woodland Hideaway area.

See also
Castles in Great Britain and Ireland
Kenilworth Castle
List of castles in England
List of owners of Warwick Castle
Old Castle Bridge - ruined medieval bridge adjacent to the castle

References
Notes

Bibliography

External links

Bibliography of sources relating to Warwick Castle
Warwick Castle 360 degree virtual panoramic photograph by Visual360Media.com
The Mill Garden, Warwick

Buildings and structures completed in 1069
Merlin Entertainments Group
Castles in Warwickshire
Gardens in Warwickshire
Buildings and structures in Warwick
Grade I listed buildings in Warwickshire
Scheduled monuments in Warwickshire
Tourist attractions in Warwickshire
Historic house museums in Warwickshire
William the Conqueror
Greville family
Gardens by Capability Brown
Motte-and-bailey castles
Warwick
Grade I listed parks and gardens in Warwickshire